Ekbatan is a 2012 Iranian Drama written and directed by Mehrshad Karkhani.

Plot
Alborz, who has been recently freed from the prison, plans a robbery to pay his sister's debts.

Cast
 Sahar Ghoreishi
 Mani Heidari
 Shahed Ahmadloo
 Mazdak Mirabedini
 Soroush Sehhat
 Davoud Rashidi
 Pourandokht Mahiman

References

 Ekbatan in the Soureh Cinema 
Ekbatan in Filcin

External links

2012 films
2010s Persian-language films
Iranian romantic drama films